Hong Xuanjiao (- fl. 1856), was a Chinese female general and rebel leader during the Taiping Rebellion. She was the sister of the leader of Taiping Heavenly Kingdom, Hong Xiuquan. She acted as co-commander of the Taiping forces during the civil war against the Imperial forces of the Qing dynasty. Xuanjiao and her brother, Xiuquan, established the Taiping Heavenly Kingdom over varying portions of southern China with himself as the "Heavenly King" and self-proclaimed younger brother of Jesus Christ.

She played a very important role in the establishment and growth of the Taiping Heavenly Kingdom. She was the right-hand man of Hong Xiuquan and Xiao Chaogui. According to wild history records, she also directly participated in leading the Tianjing Incident.

Life 
Hong Xuanjiao is believed to have been born around 1830. The sister of Hong Xiuquan, the leader of the Taiping Rebellion, she was trained in martial arts and the commander of the female soldiers in service of the Taiping army. She was known as being extraordinarily valiant, and also was responsible for the women who took part in the battle under the banner of the Taiping rebels.

During the civil war, she led thousands of women in the revolt against the dynasty. Among these women there were female warriors who became notable, such as General Su Sanniang, Qiu Ersao and others. According to some reports, Xuanjiao died in 1856, but this has not been confirmed, and other reports say she survived her brother's deposition and escaped from Nanking.

References 

19th-century births
1856 deaths
Military leaders of the Taiping Rebellion
19th-century Chinese people
People of the Taiping Rebellion
Women in 19th-century warfare
Generals from Guangxi
Hakka generals
Women in war in China
19th-century Chinese women